The Keitek Streamer is an Italian ultralight trike, designed and produced by Keitek of Remanzacco. The aircraft is supplied as a complete ready-to-fly-aircraft.

Design and development
It features a strut-braced "topless" Hazard 12S or 15S hang glider-style high-wing, weight-shift controls, a two-seats-in-tandem open cockpit with a cockpit fairing, tricycle landing gear with wheel pants and a single engine in pusher configuration.

The Streamer has a double surface wing covered in Dacron sailcloth. The Hazard 12S  span wing has supporting struts and uses an "A" frame weight-shift control bar. The powerplant is a four-cylinder, air and liquid-cooled, four-stroke, dual-ignition  Rotax 912UL engine. The fuel tank includes internal baffling and the engine oil tank is enclosed inside the fuselage.

The Hazard 12S wing gives a cruising speed that is  faster than the 15S wing.

Specifications (Streamer with Hazard 12S wing)

References

External links

2000s Italian sport aircraft
2000s Italian ultralight aircraft
Single-engined pusher aircraft
Ultralight trikes